The ME21/24 engine was Shin Mitsubishi Heavy-Industries' (one of the three divisions of Mitsubishi Heavy Industries until their consolidation in 1964) replacement for the 309 cc single-cylinder overhead valve ME20 engine. Unlike its predecessor, this was a two-stroke, a concept to which Mitsubishi was to prove faithful for its smallest engines until the 1972 introduction of the Vulcan 2G21.

General
The naming of Mitsubishi engines after the dissolution of the Zaibatsu reflected which factory they were built in. M stood for the Mizushima plant, E for engine, and 21 for being the 21st engine development by Mizushima, thus "ME21". When the 2G10 engine (a water-cooled version of the ME24) was introduced in late 1968, Mitsubishi's new unified naming convention had taken effect and thus its very different name.

The ME21 was first used in the Mitsubishi 360 light commercial of April 1961, and then in the Minica passenger car. The later ME24 engines were seen in a variety of Mitsubishi's lower end Kei cars and trucks, until production ended in late 1972. Due to ever tighter anti-pollution legislation as well as a more demanding customer base, the air-cooled ME24 eventually made way for more modern engines. When installed in the A100/100V Minicas, the ME24 was referred to as the "Yellow" engine.

ME21
The 359 cc twin cylinder two-stroke ME21/ME21A was used in the 360 pickup truck and the first generation Minica LA20. Power was only .

ME24
A lightly modified ME21 introduced in November 1964, featuring an "Auto Mix" system which made away with the need for pre-mixed gasoline/oil. It also gained one extra horsepower. In May 1967 the 21 PS reed valve ME24D was introduced. Later iterations of the ME24 were used in the base models of the second generation Minica and Minicab until replaced by a detuned version of the "Red" 2G10 engine in late 1972. The ME24E actually soldiered on in the LT30V van version of the first generation until 1976, as this was not updated alongside its truck siblings. Along with assorted other Mitsubishi parts, a  ME24 engine was also used by Hope Motor Company for their tiny ON360 off-roader, the predecessor to the Suzuki Jimny.

Specifications

Applications
1961-71 Mitsubishi 360/Minica Pick
1962-69 Mitsubishi Minica
1968-? HopeStar ON360
1969-72 Mitsubishi Minica A100/100V
1966-71 Mitsubishi Minicab LT30
1968-76 Mitsubishi Minicab LT30V
1971-72 Mitsubishi Minicab EL (T130)

See also
List of Mitsubishi engines

References
 
 
 
 World Cars 1972. Automobile Club of Italy/Herald Books, NY: 1972. p. 362-363, 

ME21 24